Hee-soo, also spelled Hui-su, is a Korean given name. Its meaning differs based on the hanja used to write each syllable of the name.

Hanja
Article 44 of South Korea's  gives the Supreme Court the power to define the list of hanja permitted for use in given names. Under the Supreme Court's regulations, that list consists of the Basic Hanja for educational use and a list of additional hanja permitted for use in given names. , the permitted hanja for the name Hee-soo comprise:

Hee (35 hanja):  
Soo (83 hanja):

People
Park Hee-soo (born 1983), South Korean baseball pitcher
Randi Heesoo Griffin (born 1988), American ice hockey player of Korean descent
Colde, stage name of Kim Hee-soo (born 1994), South Korean singer-songwriter
Byun Hui-su (1998–2021), South Korean transgender soldier
Cho Hee-soo (born 2000), South Korean figure skater

See also
List of Korean given names

References

Korean unisex given names